William Danks (b Nottingham, 3 September 1845- d Canterbury 4 September 1916) was Archdeacon of Richmond from 1894 until 1907.

Danks was educated at The Queen's College, Oxford. After a curacy at Basford he held incumbencies at Ilkley, Richmond, Yorkshire. He also wrote several books.

References

1845 births
Archdeacons of Richmond
1916 deaths
People from Nottingham
Alumni of The Queen's College, Oxford